Chili John's is a restaurant located in Green Bay, Wisconsin, that opened in 1913. A second restaurant was opened in Burbank, California, in 1946.  The Green Bay location closed in 2020.

Lithuanian immigrant John Isaac began serving Southwestern chili at his Green Bay bar in 1900. Thirteen years later, the chili grew so popular that he renamed the establishment Chili John's. The chili is most commonly served over spaghetti with oyster crackers and/or shredded cheese, though it can be ordered in a number of other ways as well.

His son Ernie moved to Los Angeles and launched Chili John's of California in 1946, installing the U-shaped counter and, since he was an avid fisherman, painted the mountain lake mural. For the past 20 years, the Loguercio family has owned Chili John's. The former owner Gene died in April 2009, and his wife Debbie has carried on with their sons Anthony and Alec.

Location was used in the TV series I Am the Night Episode 3, The Rookie Season 1 - Episode 3, Big Love Season 2, Episode 8 (Kingdom Come), and Once Upon a Time in Hollywood.

In 2021, Chili John's was featured in the first episode of Restaurant Recovery, hosted by Todd Graves and featuring Snoop Dogg. The episode has Graves helping Chili John's come back from the "brink of collapse" as a result of the COVID-19 lockdowns in Southern California.

See also
 Cincinnati chili, similar to this restaurant's signature dish, but developed independently

References

External links
Official website - Green Bay location
Official website - Burbank location

Companies based in Green Bay, Wisconsin
Restaurants established in 1913
Restaurants in Los Angeles
Burbank, California
Restaurants established in 1946
1946 establishments in California
Streamline Moderne architecture in California
1913 establishments in Wisconsin
American companies established in 1913
American companies established in 1946